Leptorhynchos (meaning "slender beak") is an extinct genus of caenagnathid dinosaurs known from the Late Cretaceous (Campanian-Maastrichtian aged) Aguja Formation of west Texas United States. It lived about 80.5–72 million years ago. It is distinguished from its relatives Chirostenotes and Anzu by its smaller size, and by a more strongly upturned mandible, similar to that of oviraptorids. The specializations of the beak in Leptorhynchos and other caenagnathids suggest that they were herbivores. The species L. elegans has since been transferred to the genus Citipes, leaving only the type species L. gaddisi in the genus. 

Leptorhynchos has been placed in the Elmisaurinae.

See also

 Timeline of oviraptorosaur research

References

Caenagnathids
Late Cretaceous dinosaurs of North America
Campanian genus first appearances
Maastrichtian genus extinctions
Maastrichtian life
Hell Creek fauna
Paleontology in Texas
Paleontology in Montana
Paleontology in Alberta
Fossil taxa described in 2013